Dida Forest is a protected forest in Burkina Faso. 
It is located in Comoé Province.

The forest is located at 330 meters above sea level.

References

Protected areas of Burkina Faso
Comoé Province